Eutelsat 8 West C, known as Hot Bird 6 prior to 2012 and Hot Bird 13A from 2012 to 2013, is a geostationary communications satellite. Operated by Eutelsat, it provides direct-to-home (DTH) broadcasting services from geostationary orbit. The satellite was part of Eutelsat's Hot Bird constellation at a longitude of 13° East, until it was relocated to 8° West between July 2013 and August 2013.

Satellite description 
Hot Bird 6 was constructed by Alcatel Space based on the Spacebus-3000B3 satellite bus, Hot Bird 6 is a  satellite with a design life of 12 years. It is equipped with an S400-12 apogee motor which was used for initial orbit-raising manoeuvres and an S10-18 engine for station keeping burns. The spacecraft has 28 Ku-band and four Ka-band transponders.

Launch 
Hot Bird 6, as it was then named, was launched on the maiden flight of the Atlas V launch vehicle, tail number AV-001, flying in the 401 configuration from SLC-41 at the Cape Canaveral Air Force Station (CCAFS). Liftoff occurred at 22:05:00 UTC on 21 August 2002, with the launch vehicle successfully injecting its payload into geosynchronous transfer orbit (GTO). The launch was conducted by International Launch Services (ILS).

Mission 
Following launch, the satellite Hot Bird 6 used its apogee motor to raise itself into geostationary orbit, positioning itself at a longitude of 13° East. In March 2012, it was renamed Hot Bird 13A by Eutelsat. It operated at this position for almost eleven years before being removed from the slot in July 2013. In August 2013, it arrived at 8° West, where it has entered service as Eutelsat 8 West C, to support the Eutelsat 8 West A satellite until the planned 2015 launch of the Eutelsat 8 West B satellite. It provides coverage of the Middle East, North Africa and eastern Europe. It was then moved in 2015 to 33° East and renamed Eutelsat 33D. Later it was renamed Eutelsat 70D when it moved to 70° East. The satellite was retired in 2016 and was moved into a graveyard orbit above the geostationary belt.

References

External links 
 
 Information about this satellite

Spacecraft launched in 2002
Spacecraft launched by Atlas rockets
Satellites using the Spacebus bus
Eutelsat satellites